John Stokes may refer to:

Politicians
John Stokes (MP for Derby), Member of Parliament (MP) Derby
John Stokes (fl.1547), MP for Westbury
John Stokes (Conservative politician) (1917–2003), British Conservative MP 1970–1992
Jack Stokes (politician) (John Edward Stokes, 1923–2000), Canadian politician, Speaker of the Legislative Assembly of Ontario
John Stokes (North Carolina judge) (1756–1790), North Carolina attorney, politician, and judge
John Stoke (MP), also known as John Stokes

Others
John William Stokes (1910–1995), Australian administrator
John Stokes (1915–1990), principal of Queen's College, Hong Kong, buried in Wolvercote Cemetery
John Stokes (born 1936), Irish musician with The Bachelors
John Stokes (comics), British comic artist who drew stories including Fishboy, Marney and The Invisibles
John Stokes (cinematographer) (born 1961), Australian cinematographer, see Hurricane Smith
John Stokes (Medal of Honor) (1871–1923), American Medal of Honor recipient
John Stokes (archdeacon of York) (died 1568), president of Queens' College, Cambridge
John Stokes (Irish mathematician) (1720–1781), Irish mathematician
John Lort Stokes (1811–1885), officer in the Royal Navy
Jack Stokes (director) (1920–2013), animation director who worked on the 1968 Beatles film Yellow Submarine
John Stokes (canon of Windsor) (died 1503), Canon of Windsor and Warden of All Souls College, Oxford
John Stokes (trade unionist) (c. 1865–1935), leader of the London Labour Party and London Trades Council
John Stokes (mountaineer) (1945–2016), British Army soldier and mountaineer
John Arthur Stokes, figure in the civil rights movement
John F. Stokes (1899–1963), American law enforcement officer
John Fisher Stokes, physician and surgeon
John Stokes (archdeacon of Armagh) (1801–1885)
John Stokes (British Army officer), involved with running the Suez Canal Company

John Stokes (bishop) (14th–15th century), see Bishop of Kilmore

See also

Jonathan Stokes (1755–1831), English physician and botanist
Jonathan W. Stokes, U.S. filmmaker
John Stoke (disambiguation)